Våga may refer to the following locations:

Våga, Agder, a village in Lindesnes municipality, Agder county, Norway
Våga, Vestland, a village in Sveio municipality, Vestland county, Norway
Våga, or Vågaholmen, the administrative centre of Rødøy municipality, Nordland county, Norway

See also
Våge (disambiguation)
Vagen (disambiguation)
Vågan
Vågen, Bergen
Vågå